Nodar Khaduri (29 August 1970 – 10 September 2019) was a Georgian academic and politician. He was Minister of Finance of Georgia 25 October 2012 until November 2016.

Biography 
Born in Tbilisi, Khaduri graduated from the Tbilisi State University with a degree in macroeconomics in 1996. From 1996 to 2004, he served on various positions in Georgia's ministries of Economy and of Finance, including being Deputy Finance Minister and the ministry's parliamentary secretary (2003–2004). He then worked for the United Nations Development Programme as a national consultant from 2004 and 2008. Khaduri lectured in economics at the Tbilisi State University from 1999 until August 2012, when he accused the university's administration of dismissing him because of his affiliation with the newly established opposition Georgian Dream party led by the tycoon Bidzina Ivanishvili. In October 2012, with the Georgian Dream's victory in the parliamentary election, Khaduri was elected to the Parliament of Georgia, but he was later appointed Minister of Finance in the cabinet of Bidzina Ivanishvili. He retained this position in the succeeding cabinet of Irakli Garibashvili, Ivanishvili's choice as his successor, in November 2013.

References

1970 births
2019 deaths
Economists from Georgia (country)
Finance ministers of Georgia
Georgian Dream politicians
Government ministers of Georgia (country)
Tbilisi State University alumni
Academic staff of Tbilisi State University
21st-century politicians from Georgia (country)